The 1970 Swedish Open was a combined men's and women's  tennis tournament played on outdoor clay courts held in Båstad, Sweden and was part of the Grand Prix circuit of the 1970 Tour. It was the 23rd edition of the tournament and was held from 2 July through 12 July 1970. Dick Crealy and Peaches Bartkowicz won the singles titles.

Finals

Men's singles
 Dick Crealy defeated  Georges Goven 6–3, 6–1, 6–1

Women's singles
 Peaches Bartkowicz defeated  Ingrid Bentzer 6–1, 6–1

Doubles
 Dick Crealy /  Allan Stone defeated  Željko Franulović /  Jan Kodeš 6–2, 2–6, 12–12, RET.

References

External links
 ITF tournament edition details

Swedish Open
Swedish Open
Swedish Open
Swedish Open